Job Shipululo Amupanda (born 28 August 1987 in Omaalala, Oshana Region) is a Namibian activist and politician who served as Mayor of the City of Windhoek, in office from 2 December 2020 to 1 December 2021. He is an academic at the University of Namibia before he co-founded the Affirmative Repositioning movement, a movement setup by radical youth activists of the SWAPO Party Youth League in November 2014.

Early life and education
Amupanda was born in northern Namibia in Omaalala in 1987. He was raised by his grandmother Theopolina Adolf whom he used to help sell merchandise as a child.

From 2005 Amupanda studied at the University of Namibia (UNAM) where he graduated with a bachelor's degree in political science, and from 2008 served as the president of the Students' Council where he gained popularity during his tenure.

Education
In 2010 he continued his studies at Stellenbosch University where he graduated with BA Honours in political science (2010) and MA in political science (2012). He also holds a BA Honors in history from the University of South Africa. While at Stellenbosch he founded the Stellenbosch Political Science Students Association (SPOSSA) and a served as political education officer and later deputy secretary of the South African Students Congress. He dedicated his master's degree  to the children of Namibia especially those who went to school without shoes. In 2020, he graduated with a PhD in Political Studies at the University of Namibia. His dissertation titled The Consolidated Diamond Mines and the Natives in Colonial Namibia: A Critical Analysis of the Role of Illegal Diamonds and the Development of Owamboland (1908 - 1990). Amupanda was one of the few radical youths in Namibia and is very outspoken on youth matters. He scooped the Windhoek Observer 2015 award of Newsmaker of the year in the politics category where he was competing with, amongst others President Hage Geingob and went to get the Overall Newsmaker award for the year 2015.

In 2015 Amupanda started lecturing political science at his alma mater UNAM. A year later, he was appointed Deputy Dean of his faculty, the youngest at the institution at the time. Utaara Mootu, Inna Hengari, Joseph Kalimbwe and Henny Seibeb were all his students.

Activism career
Amupanda was first introduced to youth leadership when he was elected to the UNAM SRC in 2007 as secretary for information and publicity. The following year, he became president of the organisation at the age of 22.

In 2013, he joined the SWAPO Party Youth League after being elected as the SPYL secretary for mobilisation and information by the structures of youth wing. While at the party's youth organisation, he advocated for land reforms and democratisation of state institutions. However, his stance of giving land to the landless Namibians was met with disagreements within the top four of the SWAPO Party which included President Hifikepunye Pohamba, his then deputy Hage Geingob, party Secretary General Nangolo Mbumba and his deputy who together ruled to remove and expel Amupanda along with Dimbulukeni Nauyoma, George Kambala and Elijah Ngurare from the party. After his expulsion from the party, Amupanda formed the Affirmative Repositioning movement to advocate for land and other issues affecting youths in Namibia.

Personal life
On 17 August 2019, Amupanda married his long time partner, Taimi Iileka, a Sisa Namandje Incorporation lawyer in a private ceremony at his hometown village of Omaalala. Amupanda lives in Windhoek. He is an avid boxing fan and participates in boxing activities.

Affirmative Repositioning
Amupanda holds political admiration for Burkina Faso's Thomas Sankara, Zimbabwe's former president Robert Mugabe, South Africa's Steve Biko, Robert Sobukwe and Julius Malema, leader of the Economic Freedom Fighters.

In November 2014, Amupanda, Dimbulukeni Nauyoma and George Kambala, all of the SWAPO Youth League, occupied land in the affluent Klein Windhoek suburb as a means to demand land in the city, and in response to reports of corruption by the Windhoek municipality. They named their action Erf 2014 to coincide with the year of action. This move was seen by SWAPO as an illegal grab of municipal land, and all three activists were expelled. Amupanda had shortly before resigned from his position as spokesperson for the SWAPO Party Youth League.

Subsequently, Amupanda, Nauyoma and Kambala formed the Affirmative Repositioning (AR) movement. The movement mobilised thousands of young people who turned up at the City of Windhoek's head office in Windhoek and submitted over 14,000 land application forms. He successfully challenged his expulsion from the party in court and was reinstated as a party member in May 2016.

Mayor of Windhoek 
In November 2019, Amupanda began to position himself for the position of Mayor of Windhoek under his organization, the Affirmative Repositioning Movement. On 2 December, following months of campaigning, he was elected Mayor of the city after the opposition voted in his favour to lead the municipality.

References

External links
 Official Twitter page
 Official Facebook page

1987 births
Living people
People from Oshana Region
SWAPO politicians
Namibian activists
Namibian political scientists
Politicians from Windhoek
Stellenbosch University alumni
Academic staff of the University of Namibia
University of Namibia alumni
University of South Africa alumni